February 20 - Eastern Orthodox liturgical calendar - February 22

All fixed commemorations below are observed on March 6 (March 5 on leap years) by Eastern Orthodox Churches on the Old Calendar.

For February 21st, Orthodox Churches on the Old Calendar commemorate the Saints listed on February 8.

Saints

 Saint Eustathius of Antioch, Archbishop of Antioch (337)
 Hieromartyr Severian, Bishop of Scythopolis in Palestine (452)
 Venerable Andreas and Anatolios, monastics of the Church of Jerusalem, disciples of Venerable Euthymius the Great (5th century)
 Saint Maximianus of Ravenna, Bishop of Ravenna and Confessor (c. 556)  (see also: February 22)
 Saint John Scholasticus, Patriarch of Constantinople (577)
 Saint Zachariah, Patriarch of Jerusalem (632)
 Venerable Timothy of Symbola on Mt. Olympus in Bithynia (795)
 Saint George of Amastris, Bishop of Amastris on the Black Sea (c. 805)

Pre-Schism Western saints

 Saint Felix of Metz, third Bishop of Metz in France for over forty years (2nd century))
 Saint Severus and Sixty-Two Companions, martyrs in Syrmium in Pannonia (3rd-4th centuries)
 Saint Alexander of Adrumetum, martyred with others in North Africa (c. 434)
 Martyrs Verulus, Secundinus, Siricius, Felix, Servulus, Saturninus, Fortunatus and Companions, martyrs in North Africa, probably under the Vandals (c. 434)
 Saint Paterius, a monk, disciple and friend of St Gregory the Great, he became Bishop of Brescia and was a prolific writer (606))
 Saint Pepin of Landen, Duke of Brabant, he was the husband of St Ida and the father of St Gertrude of Nivelles and St Begga (c. 646)
 Saint Ercongotha, daughter of King Erconbert of Kent and St Saxburgh, became a nun at Faremoutiers-en-Brie under her aunt, St Ethelburgh, but reposed very young (660)
 Saint Gundebert (Gumbert, Gondelbert), Bishop of Sens in France, later the founder of the monastery of Senones around 660 (c. 676)
 Saint Germanus of Granfelden, Abbot of Granfield in the Val Moutier in Switzerland, martyred with another monk, Randoald, while interceding for the poor (677)
 Saint Avitus II of Clermont, Bishop of Clermont in Auvergne, one of the great bishops of the age (689)
 Saint Valerius, a monk and Abbot of San Pedro de Montes, he left several ascetic writings (695)

Post-Schism Orthodox saints

 Saint Macarius, Hieroschemamonk of Glinsk Hermitage (1864)

New martyrs and confessors

 New Hieromartyrs Alexander Vislyansky, Daniel Alferov and Gregory Klebanov, Priests (1930)
 New Hieromartyr Constantine Pyatikrestovsky, Priest and Paul Shirokogorov, Deacon (1938)
 Virgin-Martyr Olga Koshelev (1939)

Other commemorations

 "Kozelshchina" (Kolzelshchanskaya) Icon of the Most Holy Theotokos (1881)
 Repose of Blessed Simon (Todorsky), bishop of Pskov (1754)  (see also: February 22)

Icon gallery

Notes

References

Sources
 February 21 / March 6. Orthodox Calendar (Pravoslavie.ru).
 March 6 / February 21. Holy Trinity Russian Orthodox Church (A parish of the Patriarchate of Moscow).
 February 21. OCA - The Lives of the Saints.
 The Autonomous Orthodox Metropolia of Western Europe and the Americas. St. Hilarion Calendar of Saints for the year of our Lord 2004. St. Hilarion Press (Austin, TX). pp. 16-17.
 The Twenty-First Day of the Month of February. Orthodoxy in China.
 February 21. Latin Saints of the Orthodox Patriarchate of Rome.
 The Roman Martyrology. Transl. by the Archbishop of Baltimore. Last Edition, According to the Copy Printed at Rome in 1914. Revised Edition, with the Imprimatur of His Eminence Cardinal Gibbons. Baltimore: John Murphy Company, 1916. pp. 54-55.
 Rev. Richard Stanton. A Menology of England and Wales, or, Brief Memorials of the Ancient British and English Saints Arranged According to the Calendar, Together with the Martyrs of the 16th and 17th Centuries. London: Burns & Oates, 1892. p. 80.

Greek Sources
 Great Synaxaristes:  21 Φεβρουαρίου. Μεγασ Συναξαριστησ.
  Συναξαριστής. 21 Φεβρουαρίου. Ecclesia.gr. (H Εκκλησια τησ Ελλαδοσ).

Russian Sources
  6 марта (21 февраля). Православная Энциклопедия под редакцией Патриарха Московского и всея Руси Кирилла (электронная версия). (Orthodox Encyclopedia - Pravenc.ru).
  21 февраля (ст.ст.) 6 марта 2014 (нов. ст.). Русская Православная Церковь Отдел внешних церковных связей. (Decr).

February in the Eastern Orthodox calendar